The Late Hemingfordian  North American Stage on the geologic timescale is the North American  faunal stage according to the North American Land Mammal Ages chronology (NALMA), typically set from 20,430,000 to 16,300,000 years BP, a period of . It is usually considered to overlap the Early Miocene. The Hemingfordian is preceded by the Early Barstovian and followed by the Early Hemingfordian NALMA stages.

References

Hemingfordian•
Hemingfordian•
Hemingfordian•